Spilarctia alba is a moth in the family Erebidae. It was described by Otto Vasilievich Bremer and William Grey in 1853. It is found in China (Beijing, Hebei, Hubei, Hunan, Shaanxi, Jiangxi, Zhejiang, Fujian, Sichuan, Yunnan, Guizhou), Taiwan and Korea.

Subspecies
 Spilarctia alba alba
 Spilarctia alba hainana (Rothschild, 1910)
 Spilarctia alba kikuchii (Matsumura, 1927)

References

Arctiidae genus list at Butterflies and Moths of the World of the Natural History Museum

Moths described in 1853
alba